Anthony Carrigan (born January 2, 1983) is an American actor. Since 2018, he has portrayed Chechen mobster NoHo Hank in the HBO series Barry, for which he was nominated twice for the Primetime Emmy Award for Outstanding Supporting Actor in a Comedy Series in 2019 and 2022. He is also known for playing Tyler Davies in the television series The Forgotten (2009–2010), Victor Zsasz in the FOX series Gotham (2014–2019), and robot Dennis Caleb McCoy in Bill & Ted Face the Music (2020).

Personal life 
Since childhood, Carrigan has had alopecia areata, an autoimmune disease that causes hair loss. He had mild symptoms growing up with only small, manageable bald spots, but he started losing more hair in his 20s and has spoken of wearing makeup and artificial eyebrows while filming The Forgotten. He is now known for his complete lack of hair, eyebrows, and eyelashes, and has incorporated this into his career, often being typecast as a television villain.

Carrigan is married to professional chess-player Gia Olimp, whom he met at the Broadway-Lafayette Street train station in New York City.

Filmography

Film

Television

Awards and nominations

References

External links
 

1983 births
Living people
American male television actors
21st-century American male actors
Male actors from Boston
People with autoimmune disease
Carnegie Mellon University College of Fine Arts alumni
American people of Irish descent